They Dare Not Love is a 1941 romantic war drama film directed by James Whale and starring George Brent, Martha Scott and Paul Lukas. Whale left the picture before the end of production; it was the last film released to credit him as director.

Plot
A prince flees Austria when the Nazis take over and settles in London. He encounters a beautiful Austrian émigré who makes him realize his mistake in leaving. He strikes a deal with the Nazis to return in exchange for some Austrian prisoners, but discovers that the Nazis are not to be trusted.

Cast
George Brent – Prince Kurt von Rotenberg
Martha Scott – Marta Keller
Paul Lukas – Baron von Helsing
Roman Bohnen – Baron Shafter
Kay Linaker – Barbara Murdoch

Rest of cast listed alphabetically:	

Sig Arno – Louis
Georgia Backus – German secretary	
Edgar Barrier – Capt. Wilhelm Ehrhardt
Don Beddoe – Second sailor
Nicholas Bela – First sailor
Leon Belasco – Pierre
Olga Borget – Stewardess
Egon Brecher – Prof. Keller
Lloyd Bridges – Blonde officer
Stanley Brown – Michael
Jack Chefe – Deck steward
Peter Cushing – Sub-Lieutenant Blackler
Leslie Denison – English father
Paul Deno – Doorman
Eddie Fetherston – Reporter
Richard Fiske – Photographer
Hans Fuerberg – Waiter
Jack Gardner – Photographer
Gregory Gaye – Von Mueller
Jac George – Orchestra leader
Robert Heller – German attendant
Brenda Henderson – English girl
Erwin Kalser – Klaus
Cy Kendall – Major Kenlein
Richard Lyon – English boy
Philo McCullough – Photographer
David Oliver – Photographer
Gerald Pierce – Messenger boy
Paul Power – Society man
Frank Reicher – Captain
Georges Renavent – Belgian captain
John Rogers – Noncommissioned officer
Bodil Rosing – Leni
Hans Schumm – Bruckner
Walter Stahl – Count Marlik
Marguerita Sylva – Countess Marlik
Phil Taylor – Hugo
Philip Van Zandt – Radio operator
Frederik Vogeding – Carl Schmidt
Charles Wagenheim – Valet
Poppy Wilde – Society girl
Fred Wolff – Waiter

Production
A The Hollywood Reporter article, toward the end of production, reported that Charles Vidor took over from director James Whale, who had fallen ill with the flu. Later, reports of difficulties on set surfaced, including allegations that Whale was abusive toward the cast. Writer Charles Bennett blamed Columbia head Harry Cohn, speculating about a personality conflict and saying that the firing was "... utterly ridiculous, because James Whale was a magnificent director."

They Dare Not Love was Whale's last completed film. He directed a segment of the 1952 RKO film Face to Face, "Hello Out There", but it was not included in the released film.

Critical reception
The New York Times wrote, "with all the proved talent Columbia put behind the manufacture of They Dare Not Love it is hard to understand why the new film at Loew's State should turn out to be the disappointment it is. Granting that James Whale's direction is pedestrian, that the performances of Martha Scott, George Brent and Paul Lukas are no better, we still feel that the root of all evil in this case sprouted back in the story department presided over by Charles Bennett, Ernest Vajda and James Edward Grant. Though the plot they whipped up probably is no more fantastic than some of the things happening in the world today it does not rouse either one's imagination or emotions ... They Dare Not Love is vapid fare."

References

External links

1941 films
1940s war drama films
Films directed by James Whale
Films produced by Samuel Bischoff
Columbia Pictures films
Films set in London
American war drama films
American black-and-white films
American romantic drama films
1941 romantic drama films
1940s English-language films
1940s American films